Newcastle Racecourse is a horse racing course located at Gosforth Park in Newcastle upon Tyne, England, owned by Arena Racing Company. It stages both flat and National Hunt racing, with its biggest meeting being the Northumberland Plate held annually in June.

History
Horseracing began in the North East over 350 years ago, beginning in Killingworth in the early 17th century. A King's Plate for 5 year olds, run in 3 mile heats was instigated by George II in 1753. The Town Moor hosted the first recorded Northumberland Plate in 1833 and did so until 1881 when the race transferred to High Gosforth Park. 1882 saw the first running of the Plate at Gosforth Park with a new flat and chase course, new stand and stabling for 100 horses.

In April, 2002 the Scottish businessman David Williamson joined Newcastle Racecourse as managing director and during a six-year period he transformed their fortunes and helped boost turnover from £2.5m to £6.5m. The Northumberland Plate weekend now brings in £30m to the regional economy and he also introduced Ladies' Day which now attracts over 15,000 racegoers. In April, 2008 he was headhunted by Newcastle United and appointed Executive Director (Operations). Williamson was replaced by Mark Spincer.

In December 2013 Newcastle's owners, Arena Racing Company, announced plans to change the flat turf course into an all-weather track while retaining a turf jump racing course. The new Tapeta track was completed in early 2016 with the first meeting held on 17 May of that year.

Notable races

Discontinued Flat races:
 Beeswing Stakes (last run in 1999)
 Seaton Delaval Stakes (last run in 1985)

References

External links
Newcastle Racecourse (Official website)
Course guide on GG.COM
Course guide on At The Races

 
Sports venues in Newcastle upon Tyne
Horse racing venues in England
Sports venues completed in 1882